Just a Collection of Antiques and Curios is the third album by the Strawbs, mostly recorded live at the Queen Elizabeth Hall in London on 11 July 1970. The album reached number 27 in the UK Albums Chart.

The band line-up had changed from the previous album, Dragonfly. Only founder-members Dave Cousins and Tony Hooper remained; with double bass player Ron Chesterman and cellist Claire Deniz having departed the band, and bassist John Ford, drummer Richard Hudson, and keyboardist Rick Wakeman having joined.

The concert was instrumental in bringing Rick Wakeman's virtuosity to the attention of the music media, when Melody Maker prophesied super-stardom for the keyboard player.

Track listing
"Where is This Dream of Your Youth" was originally released as a track on Strawbs.

Side one
"Martin Luther King's Dream" (Dave Cousins) – 2:53
"The Antique Suite" (Cousins) – 12:12
"The Reaper"
"We Must Cross the River"
"Antiques and Curios"
"Hey It's Been a Long Time"
"Temperament of Mind" (Rick Wakeman) – 4:50
Side two
"Fingertips" (Cousins) – 6:14
"Song of a Sad Little Girl" (Cousins) – 5:28
"Where Is This Dream of Your Youth" (Cousins) – 9:07
Bonus tracks
The following tracks are offered as bonus tracks on the A&M re-issue CD.

"The Vision of the Lady of the Lake" (Cousins) – 10:03
"We'll Meet Again Sometime" (Cousins) – 4:17
"Forever" (Cousins, Tony Hooper) – 3:32

"Forever" is a studio track and was released as a single in 1970. All other tracks were taken from the concert recording.

Personnel
Dave Cousins – vocals, acoustic guitar, electric guitar, dulcimer
Tony Hooper – vocals, acoustic guitar, tambourine
John Ford – vocals, bass guitar
Rick Wakeman – piano, organ, harpsichord, celeste
Richard Hudson – vocals, drums, congas, percussion, sitar

Recording
Produced and mixed by Tony Visconti
Recorded by Bob Auger

Release history

Notes

References
Just a Collection of Antiques and Curios on Strawbsweb
Sleeve notes CD 540 938-2 Just a Collection of Antiques and Curios

Albums produced by Tony Visconti
1970 live albums
Strawbs live albums
A&M Records live albums